Williams Bay Air Force Station (ADC ID: P-31) is a closed United States Air Force General Surveillance Radar station. It was closed in 1960.

History
In late 1951 Air Defense Command selected Elkhorn, Wisconsin site as one of twenty-eight radar stations built as part of the second segment of the permanent radar surveillance network. Prompted by the start of the Korean War, on July 11, 1950, the Secretary of the Air Force asked the Secretary of Defense for approval to expedite construction of the second segment of the permanent network. Receiving the Defense Secretary's approval on July 21, the Air Force directed the Corps of Engineers to proceed with construction.

On 27 November 1950 the 755th Aircraft Control and Warning Squadron began operating a pair of AN/CPS-6B radars at the site, designated LP-31. The site was renamed Williams Bay Air Force Station on 1 December 1953, and initially the station functioned as a Ground-Control Intercept (GCI) and warning station.  As a GCI station, the squadron's role was to guide interceptor aircraft toward unidentified intruders picked up on the unit's radar scopes.   An AN/FPS-6 height-finder radar was added in 1959.

In addition to the main facility, Williams Bay operated the following AN/FPS-18 Gap Filler sites:
 Monee, IL         (RP-31D) 

Williams Bay ceased operations in January 1960 as a budget reduction move, the mission and organization being transferred to the existing United States Army Arlington Heights facility C-80DC for the Nike Missile air-defense system, as part of the Chicago-Gary Defense Area.

Approximately one acre, located in the southwest corner of the Air Force Station property, was retained by the Air Force as a Gap Filler site (RP-31F) for  Arlington Heights, although it is unclear if any FPS-18 radars were installed. Most of the station was excessed to the General Service Administration, which sold it to the State of Wisconsin in 1962, and used as a Prisoner Re-Release minimum security prison on the site until 1972. The Gap Filler Annex was declared excess on 4 January 1968, and sold to private ownership on 5 November 1969.

In 1974, the State sold the site to private interests, currently operating it as the Williams Bay Industrial Park, using some of the old USAF buildings.  The former family housing units are maintained as private residences.   Several auto junkyards are also on the former Air Force property.

There is a small Wisconsin Historical Society Marker on the former air force station honoring the 755th AC&W Squadron.

See also
 United States general surveillance radar stations

References

 Cornett, Lloyd H. and Johnson, Mildred W., A Handbook of Aerospace Defense Organization  1946–1980,  Office of History, Aerospace Defense Center, Peterson AFB, CO (1980).
 Winkler, David F. & Webster, Julie L., Searching the Skies, The Legacy of the United States Cold War Defense Radar Program,  US Army Construction Engineering Research Laboratories, Champaign, IL (1997).
 Information for Williams Bay AFS, WI

External links
 Williams Bay, WI – Abandoned Air Force Radar Sites on Waymarking.com
 Recent Photos of Williams Bay AFS, WI

Buildings and structures in Walworth County, Wisconsin
Radar stations of the United States Air Force
Installations of the United States Air Force in Wisconsin
Aerospace Defense Command military installations
1950 establishments in Wisconsin
Military installations established in 1950
Military installations closed in 1960
1960 disestablishments in Wisconsin